Monas was Bishop of Milan from the end 3rd-century to early 4th-century. He is honoured as a Saint in the Catholic Church and his feast day is on October 12.

Life
Almost nothing is known about the life and the episcopate of Monas. He was elected as bishop of Milan in some year at the end of the 3rd-century (tentatively on 283), and his episcopate lasted till some year before the 313, when surely the bishop of Milan was already Mirocles.

Monas died on the 25 March (the year had not been recorded) and his corpse was buried near the church of Saint Vitalis of Milan (Basilica Fausta), that was placed in the area where now stand the Basilica of Sant'Ambrogio. Under the episcopate of Arnulf II (998-1018), on a 12 October, his relic were discovered and translated into the church of Saint Vitale near the Basilica Naboriana (now demolished). On 6 February 1576 his relics were translated by Saint Charles Borromeo to the Cathedral of Milan where are today.

A late tradition, with no historical basis, associates Monas with the Milan's noble family of the Borri. To Monas is attributed the foundation of the parish church of Corbetta. Monas is also venerated in a chapel, renovated in the 17th century by the Borri family, in the Santuario della Beata Vergine dei Miracoli of Corbetta.

Notes

Archbishops of Milan
4th-century Christian saints
Italian saints
Burials at Milan Cathedral